Birgitte Dorothea Henriette Nielsen, pen name Theodora, (23 January 1815 – 17 January 1900) was a Danish author and playwright born in Strandgården, Vester Thorup, in the north of Jutland. Her Slægtningene (1849), presented in Copenhagen's Royal Danish Theatre, was particularly successful with its pre-vaudeville atmosphere, local costumes from Fanø and songs she had composed herself. It ran to 78 performances.

Her 1862 novel Esberhs Skolehistorier (Esberh's School Stories) is seen as an early example of works calling for women's emancipation.

References

1815 births
1900 deaths
Danish women dramatists and playwrights
19th-century Danish poets
19th-century Danish dramatists and playwrights
19th-century Danish women writers
People from Jammerbugt Municipality
National anthem writers
Danish women's rights activists]